The following outline is provided as an overview of and topical guide to Burundi:

The Republic of Burundi is a small sovereign country located in the Great Lakes region of Africa. Geographically isolated, facing population pressures and having sparse resources, Burundi has the lowest GDP per capita in the world, arguably making it the poorest country on the planet. One scientific study of 178 nations rated Burundi's population as having the lowest satisfaction with life of all.

General reference

 Pronunciation:  or 
 Common English country name:  Burundi
 Official English country name:  The Republic of Burundi
 Common endonym(s):  
 Official endonym(s):  
 Adjectival(s): Burundian
 Demonym(s):
 ISO country codes: BI, BDI, 108
 ISO region codes: See ISO 3166-2:BI
 Internet country code top-level domain: .bi

Geography of Burundi 

Geography of Burundi
 Burundi is: a landlocked country
 Location: Africa
 Southern Hemisphere and Eastern Hemisphere
 Africa
 Central Africa
 East Africa
 Time zone:  Central Africa Time (UTC+02)
 Extreme points of Burundi
 High:  Mount Heha 
 Low:  Lake Tanganyika 
 Land boundaries:  974 km
 451 km
 290 km
 233 km
 Coastline:  none
 Population: 3,589,434(1978)
 Size:  - 145th largest country
 Atlas of Burundi

Environment of Burundi 

 Climate of Burundi
 Ecoregions in Burundi
 Geology of Burundi
 Protected areas of Burundi
 National parks of Burundi
 Wildlife of Burundi
 Fauna of Burundi
 Birds of Burundi
 Mammals of Burundi

Natural geographic features of Burundi 

 Glaciers in Burundi: none
 Lakes of Burundi
 Lake Tanganyika
 Lake Cohoha
 Lake Rweru
 Mountains of Burundi
 Mitumba Mountains
 Rivers of Burundi
 Kagera River
 Ruvyironza River
 Rurubu River
 Ruzizi River
 World Heritage Sites in Burundi: none

Regions of Burundi 

Regions of Burundi

Ecoregions of Burundi 

List of ecoregions in Burundi

Administrative divisions of Burundi 

Administrative divisions of Burundi
 Provinces of Burundi
 Communes of Burundi
 Collines of Burundi

Provinces of Burundi 

Provinces of Burundi

Communes of Burundi 

Communes of Burundi
The provinces of Burundi are divided into 117 communes, which are further divided into 2,637 collines.

Municipalities of Burundi 

 Capital of Burundi: Bujumbura
 Cities of Burundi
 List of cities in Burundi
 Bubanza
 Bujumbura
 Bururi
 Cankuzo
 Cibitoke
 Gitega
 Karuzi
 Kayanza
 Kibumbu
 Kirundo
 Makamba
 Muramvya
 Muyinga
 Mwaro
 Ngozi
 Rutana
 Ruyigi

Demography of Burundi 

Demographics of Burundi

Government and politics of Burundi 

Politics of Burundi
 Form of government: presidential representative democratic republic
 Capital of Burundi: Bujumbura
 Elections in Burundi
 Political parties in Burundi
 Rulers of Burundi
 United Nations Integrated Office in Burundi

Branches of government

Government of Burundi

Executive branch of the government of Burundi 
 Head of state: President of Burundi
 Vice-President of Burundi
 Head of government: President of Burundi
 List of heads of government of Burundi
 Cabinet of Burundi: Council of Ministers

Ministries of the Burundian Government 
 Ministry of Public Security of Burundi

Legislative branch of the government of Burundi 

 Parliament of Burundi (bicameral)
 Upper house: Senate of Burundi (upper chamber)
 Lower house: National Assembly of Burundi (lower chamber)

Judicial branch of the government of Burundi 

Court system of Burundi
 Supreme Court of Burundi

Foreign relations of Burundi 

Foreign relations of Burundi
 Diplomatic missions in Burundi
 Diplomatic missions of Burundi
 United States-Burundi relations

International organization membership 
The Republic of Burundi is a member of:

Central African Customs and Economic Union (UDEAC)
Coordinating Committee on Export Controls (COCOM)
Economic and Monetary Community of Central Africa (CEMAC)
International Atomic Energy Agency (IAEA)
International Bank for Reconstruction and Development (IBRD)
International Chamber of Commerce (ICC)
International Committee of the Red Cross (ICRC)
International Criminal Police Organization (Interpol)
International Energy Agency (IEA)
International Finance Corporation (IFC)
International Fund for Agricultural Development (IFAD)
International Hydrographic Organization (IHO)
International Labour Organization (ILO)
International Olympic Committee (IOC)
International Organization for Migration (IOM)

International Red Cross and Red Crescent Movement (ICRM)
International Telecommunication Union (ITU)
International Telecommunications Satellite Organization (ITSO)
Inter-Parliamentary Union (IPU)
Organisation internationale de la Francophonie (OIF)
Organisation of Islamic Cooperation (OIC)
United Nations (UN)
United Nations Environment Program (UNEP)
United Nations High Commissioner for Refugees (UNHCR)
United Nations University (UNU)
World Confederation of Labour (WCL)
World Federation of Trade Unions (WFTU)
World Food Program (WFP)
World Health Organization (WHO)
World Intellectual Property Organization (WIPO)
World Tourism Organization (UNWTO)

Law and order in Burundi 

Law of Burundi
 Constitution of Burundi
 Human rights in Burundi
 LGBT rights in Burundi
 Freedom of religion in Burundi
 Polygamy in Burundi
 Law enforcement in Burundi
 Ministry of Public Security of Burundi

Military of Burundi 

Military of Burundi
 Command
 Commander-in-chief:
 Forces
 Army of Burundi
 Navy of Burundi: None
 Air Force of Burundi

Local government in Burundi 

Local government in Burundi
 List of Burundian provincial governors

History of Burundi 

History of Burundi
Current events of Burundi

By period 
 Kingdom of Burundi
 Burundian monarchy
 List of kings of Burundi
 Karyenda
 Mutaga IV Mbikije of Burundi
 Mwambutsa I Mbariza
 Mwambutsa IV Bangiriceng of Burundi
 Mwami
 Mwami Mutaga III Senyamwiza Mutamo
 Mwezi III Ndagushimiye of Burundi
 Mwezi IV Gisabo of Burundi
 Ntare I Kivimira Savuyimba Semunganzashamba Rushatsi Cambarantama
 Ntare IV Rutaganzwa Rugamba
 Ntare V
 Burundi Colonial Period
 German East Africa
 German East African rupie
 Colonial heads of Burundi
 Ruanda-Urundi
 Colonial heads of Burundi (Ruanda-Urundi)
 Colonial heads of Burundi (Urundi)
 League of Nations Class B Mandate
 United Nations Trust Territory#Former German Schutzgebiete
 Burundi independence
 Martyazo
 Heads of state of Martyazo
 Burundi Civil War
 Itaba massacre
 United Nations Security Council Resolution 1375
 United Nations Security Council Resolution 1286
 Titanic Express massacre
 Gatumba massacre
 United Nations Operation in Burundi
 United Nations Security Council Resolution 1545
 United Nations Security Council Resolution 1577
 United Nations Security Council Resolution 1602
 United Nations Security Council Resolution 1606
 Burundian constitutional referendum, 2005

By subject 
 Burundi genocide
 History of rail transport in Burundi
 National Council for the Defense of Democracy-Forces for the Defense of Democracy
 Second Congo War

Culture of Burundi 

Culture of Burundi
 Cuisine of Burundi
 Languages of Burundi
 Rundi language
 Media of Burundi
 National symbols of Burundi
 Coat of arms of Burundi
 Flag of Burundi
 National anthem of Burundi: Burundi Bwacu
 Karyenda
 Public holidays in Burundi
 Scouting and Guiding in Burundi
 World Heritage Sites in Burundi: none

Art in Burundi 
 Music of Burundi
 Karyenda
 Master Drummers of Burundi
 Royal Drummers of Burundi
 Television in Burundi

People of Burundi 
 People of Burundi

Ethnic groups in Burundi 
 Ethnic groups in Burundi
 Hutu
List of Hutus
 Tutsi
 List of Tutsis
 Great Lakes Twa

African Pygmies 
 Aka people
 Baka people (Cameroon and Gabon)
 Ota Benga
 Efé people
 Pygmy
 Pygmy music
 Twa peoples

Pygmy mythology
 Bambuti mythology
 Khonvoum

Religion in Burundi 
 Religion in Burundi
 Christianity in Burundi
 Anglican Church of Burundi
 Roman Catholicism in Burundi
 Apostolic Nuncio to Burundi
 List of Roman Catholic dioceses in Burundi
 Islam in Burundi

Sports in Burundi 

Sports in Burundi
 Football in Burundi
 Burundi national football team
 Burundi Premier League
 Football Federation of Burundi
 List of football clubs in Burundi
 Burundian footballers
 Shabani Nonda
 David Opango
 Mohammed Tchité
 Football venues in Burundi
 Prince Louis Rwagasore Stadium
 Rugby Union in Burundi
 Burundi national rugby union team
 Burundi at the Olympics
 Burundi at the 1996 Summer Olympics
 Burundi at the 2000 Summer Olympics
 Burundi at the 2004 Summer Olympics
 Burundi at the 2008 Summer Olympics

Burundian athletes
 Arthémon Hatungimana
 Dieudonné Kwizera
 Jean-Patrick Nduwimana
 Vénuste Niyongabo
 Charles Nkazamyampi

Olympic competitors for Burundi
 Arthémon Hatungimana
 Jean-Patrick Nduwimana
 Vénuste Niyongabo
 Charles Nkazamyampi

Economy and infrastructure of Burundi 

Economy of Burundi
 Economic rank, by nominal GDP (2007): 168th (one hundred and sixty eighth)
 One of the ten poorest countries in the world.
 Has the lowest per capita GDP of any nation in the world.
 Agriculture in Burundi
 Banking in Burundi
 National bank of Burundi: Bank of the Republic of Burundi
 List of banks in Burundi
 Communications in Burundi
 Media of Burundi
 Internet in Burundi
 .bi
 Telephone service in Burundi
 AfricaPhonebook/Annulaires Afrique
 Telephone numbers in Burundi
 Postal service in Burundi
 List of fish on stamps of Burundi
 Companies of Burundi
Currency of Burundi: Franc
ISO 4217: BIF
 Energy in Burundi
 Health care in Burundi
 Mining in Burundi
 Tourism in Burundi
 Visa policy of Burundi
 Trade unions of Burundi
 Confederation of Burundi Unions
 Transportation in Burundi
 Air transport in Burundi
 Air Burundi
 Airports in Burundi
 Bujumbura International Airport
 Rail transport in Burundi

Education in Burundi 

Education in Burundi
 University of Burundi

Health in Burundi 

 Health in Burundi

See also 

Burundi

Index of Burundi-related articles
List of Burundi-related topics
List of international rankings
Member state of the United Nations
Outline of Africa
Outline of geography

References

External links

Official Burundi government website (in French)
Burundi. The World Factbook. Central Intelligence Agency.

Stanford University - Africa South of the Sahara: Burundi directory category
University of Pennsylvania - African Studies Center: Burundi directory category

 
Burundi